Fields and Gardens poetry, in poetry) is a poetic movement which sparked centuries of poetic enthusiasm, generally considered to effectively date from the Six Dynasties era. Both the Chinese Landscape poetry and the Fields and Gardens poetry share a common theme of nature foremost with human beings and human thought seemingly not in main focus; however, in the case of the Fields and Gardens genre the nature that was focused upon was more domestic—the nature found in gardens, in backyards, and in the cultivated countryside. Sometimes, the poems were designed to be viewed with a particular work of art, others were intended to be "textual art" that invoked an image inside a reader's mind. Fields and Gardens poetry is one of many Classical Chinese poetry genres.

One of the main practitioners of the Fields and Gardens poetry genre was Tao Yuanming (also known as Tao Qian (365–427), among other names or versions of names). Tao Yuanming has been regarded as the first great poet associated with the Fields and Gardens poetry genre.

Translator and commentator David Hinton sees the Fields and Gardens genre as more of a subgenre of the Shanshui (mountains-and-waters) genre, than as a standalone, side-by-side genre under the general heading of Chinese landscape poetry.

See also
Chang Jian
Chinese garden
Chinese poetry
Classical Chinese poetry
Meng Haoran
Pei Di
Qiu Wei
Return to the Field
Shanshui poetry
Wang Wei (Tang dynasty)

Notes

References
Watson, Burton (1971). Chinese Lyricism: Shih Poetry from the Second to the Twelfth Century. (New York: Columbia University Press). 
Hinton, David (2008). Classical Chinese Poetry: An Anthology. New York: Farrar, Straus, and Giroux.  / .
Yip, Wai-lim (1997). Chinese Poetry: An Anthology of Major Modes and Genres . (Durham and London: Duke University Press). 

Chinese poetry genres